J. Phillips was the head baseball coach of the LSU Tigers baseball team in 1907. During his one season as head coach, he finished the season with an 11–7 record and  winning percentage.

References

Baseball coaches from Louisiana
LSU Tigers baseball coaches